Greenwood Memorial Park is a cemetery located on unincorporated land surrounded by the city of San Diego at 4300 Imperial Avenue in San Diego County, California. The cemetery is adjacent to Mount Hope Cemetery.

Opened in 1907, Greenwood covers approximately  five miles east of Downtown San Diego. The cemetery is an example of a rural cemetery, incorporating architecture, art, and landscaping into its design. Greenwood and its accompanying mortuary are now part of NorthStar Memorial Group (NSMP).

Notable interments
 Belle Benchley (1882–1973), director of the San Diego Zoo from 1927–1953
 Dan Broderick, attorney, and his wife Linda, murdered by his ex-wife, Betty Broderick, in 1989
 Victor Buono (1938–1982), character actor (He is entombed with his mother, Myrtle, but his name is not inscribed on the crypt.)
 George Burnham (1868–1939), banker, politician
 Marvel Crosson (1904–1929), pioneer female aviator
 Bob Elliott (1916–1966), Major League Baseball player, 1947 National League MVP
 David Faber (1928–2015), Polish-born Holocaust survivor, author, lecturer
 Walter Fuller (1910–2003), jazz trumpeter and vocalist, civil-rights activist
 Ulysses S. "Buck" Grant, Jr. (1852–1929), son of Ulysses S. Grant, attorney and investment capitalist, developer of the U.S. Grant Hotel
 Ulysses S. Grant IV (1893–1977), grandson of President Ulysses S. Grant and former chairman of the Department of Geology, University of California at Los Angeles
 Burke Hanford (1872–1928), sailor, recipient of the Medal of Honor
 William "Bill" Kettner (1864–1930), United States Congressman, civic booster
 Jonathan Latimer (1906–1983), American crime writer known his novels and screenplays.
 Moses A. Luce (1842–1933), Civil War veteran, Medal of Honor recipient, attorney, founder of Luce, Forward, Hamilton & Scripps
 Charles Schroeter (1837–1921), Civil War and Apache War veteran, Medal of Honor recipient; re-interred at Miramar National Cemetery in 2015
 Ernestine Schumann-Heink (1861–1936), operatic contralto
 Phil Swing (1884–1963), United States Congressman
 Gregon A. Williams, Marine Corps Major general; served in Nicaragua, World War II and Korean War
 Harold Bell Wright (1872–1944), best-selling writer

There is one British Commonwealth war grave to a Lieutenant-Commander Surgeon of the Royal Navy of World War I.

References

Further reading

External links
 Journal of San Diego History – San Diego Cemeteries: A Brief Guide
 Greenwood Memorial Park at Find a Grave
 
Greenwood Memorial Park Official Website 

Cemeteries in San Diego County, California
Geography of San Diego
History of San Diego